Horki (Gorki) is a village in Zhabinka District, Brest Region, Belarus.

Populated places in Brest Region
Grodno Governorate
Polesie Voivodeship